Calma apparente ("Apparently Calm" or "Assumedly Calm", in English), also known by its Spanish name Calma aparente, is a 2005 studio album by Italian singer-songwriter Eros Ramazzotti. The album was preceded by the single "La nostra vita", released on 16 September 2005 and sold 43,000 copies in Italy.

Track listing

Calma apparente

Calma aparente

Charts

Weekly charts

Year-end charts

Certifications

Notes

References 
Official website

Eros Ramazzotti albums
2005 albums
Sony BMG Norte albums
Italian-language albums
Spanish-language albums